The 1998 South Africa rugby union tour of Britain and Ireland was a series of rugby matches played by the Springboks in November and December 1998. A potential Grand Slam was lost due to the defeat by England in the final Test match.

Results
Scores and results list South Africa's points tally first.

References
 

1998 rugby union tours
1998 in South African rugby union
1998
1998–99 in European rugby union
1998–99 in Welsh rugby union
1998–99 in Irish rugby union
1998–99 in Scottish rugby union
1998–99 in English rugby union
1998
1998
1998
1998